Felimida baumanni is a species of colorful sea slug, a dorid nudibranch, a marine gastropod mollusk in the family Chromodorididae.

Distribution
This species was first described from Isla San Francisco, Baja California. It is reported from southern Mexico, central America and the Galapagos Islands.

Description
The mantle of Felimida baumanni is white with small red spots and a broken band of orange near the edge.

References

Chromodorididae
Gastropods described in 1970